Saeed Al-Adhreai (born 1 March 1983) is a Yemeni who is a track and field sprint athlete who competes internationally for Yemen, he competed in the 400 metres at the 2004 Summer Olympics and the 2005 World Championships in Athletics.

Career
When aged 21 years old Al-Adhreai competed in the 2004 Summer Olympics in Athens, Greece, he entered the 400 metres and in the heats he ran in a time of 49.39 seconds and came in last out of eight runners and so didn't qualify for the next round. Nearly twelve months later he was competing at the 2005 World Championships in Athletics again in the 400 metres, this time he ran the distance in 49.74 seconds and came in seventh out of eight in his heat and didn't qualify for the next round.

References

External links
 

1983 births
Living people
Yemeni male sprinters
Olympic athletes of Yemen
Athletes (track and field) at the 2004 Summer Olympics
21st-century Yemeni people